Union High School is a small rural public high school in La Porte City, Iowa part of the Union Community School District.  Union High School enrolled 402 students, taught by 35 faculty, as of 2011.  The school day is divided into six periods while the school year functions on three twelve-week trimesters. Drew Hemesath, bassist for American hardcore band Method, graduated from Union High School in 2008.

There are a wide variety of extra-curricular activities at Union including Fine Arts Programs and Varsity Athletics.  The Union Speech Team has distinguished itself by winning multiple Speech Banners at the All-State level.

Athletics 
The Knights compete in the North Iowa Cedar League Conference in the following sports:

Bowling
Cross Country 
 Girls' 5-time Class 2A State Champions (2001, 2007, 2008, 2009, 2010)
Volleyball 
Football 
 2011 Class 3A State Champions
Basketball 
Wrestling 
 2004 Class 2A State Duals Champions
Track and Field 
Golf 
Baseball 
Softball 
Soccer 
Tennis

See also
List of high schools in Iowa

References

Public high schools in Iowa
Schools in Black Hawk County, Iowa